NSCS may refer to:
 National Society of Collegiate Scholars
 NASCAR Sprint Cup Series